Ronald D. Rubin (born May 7, 1948) is an American bridge player. He is best known for winning the 1983 Bermuda Bowl world teams bridge championship. In addition he has won 11 North American Bridge Championships. Rubin is from North Miami Beach, Florida.

Bridge accomplishments

Awards
 Fishbein Trophy 1990
 Romex Award (Best Bid Hand of the Year) 1976

Wins
 Bermuda Bowl (1) 1983
 North American Bridge Championships (12)
 von Zedtwitz Life Master Pairs (1) 1990 
 Silodor Open Pairs (1) 1988 
 Vanderbilt (4) 1977, 1981, 1985, 1989 
 Mitchell Board-a-Match Teams (1) 1975 
 Spingold (5) 1980, 1982, 1992, 2005, 2009 
 United States Bridge Championships (3)
 Open Team Trials (3) 1982, 1993, 2005
 Other notable wins:
 Lancia Challenge Match (1) 1975
 Lancia Swiss Teams (1) 1975
 Cavendish Invitational Teams (1) 1985

Runners-up
 North American Bridge Championships (7)
 Vanderbilt (2) 1978, 2008
 Spingold (2) 1985, 1988
 Reisinger (1) 1983
 Grand National Teams (2) 1981, 1992
 United States Bridge Championships (5)
 Open Team Trials (5) 1980, 2001, 2006, 2007, 2009

References

External links

1948 births
American contract bridge players
Bermuda Bowl players
Living people
Place of birth missing (living people)
People from North Miami Beach, Florida